Mayara Magri (born May 2, 1962) is a Brazilian actress.

Personal life 
She was married to actor and director Herval Rossano until his death in 2007. She dated actor Flávio Galvão for four years.

Filmography

Television

Films

Theater 
 1984 - Hamlet
 1985 - Louco Circo do Desejo
 1987 - Black Out
 1992 - Luar em Preto e Branco
 1994 - A Gaivota
 1996 - Brasil S/A
 1999/2000 - SOS Brasil
 2002 - A Lista
 2004 - Tributo a Bidu Sayão
 2011 - As Pontes de Madison
 2015 - Elza & Fred

References

External links 

1962 births
Living people
Actresses from São Paulo
Brazilian telenovela actresses
Brazilian film actresses
Brazilian stage actresses
20th-century Brazilian actresses
21st-century Brazilian actresses
People from Mogi Guaçu